Muhammad Medhat Hassanein (born 1939) was Minister of Finance of Egypt from 1999 to 2004. He is currently professor of finance and banking in the department of management of the school of business at The American University in Cairo.

References

Finance Ministers of Egypt
Living people
1939 births
20th-century Egyptian economists
Academic staff of The American University in Cairo
Place of birth missing (living people)
20th-century Egyptian politicians
21st-century Egyptian politicians